Fazli Jaffar (born 9 May 1983 in Singapore) is a former Singaporean footballer.

References

Singaporean footballers
Living people
1983 births
Association football midfielders
Association football wingers
Gombak United FC players
Warriors FC players
Hougang United FC players